The 1929 St. Xavier Musketeers football team was an American football team that represented St. Xavier College (later renamed Xavier University) as a member of the Ohio Athletic Conference (OAC) during the 1929 college football season. In its tenth season under head coach Joseph A. Meyer, the team compiled a 6–4 record (0–2 against OAC opponents) and outscored all opponents by a total of 104 to 92.

Prior to the 1929 season, a new football stadium was built on the school's athletic campus at a cost of $300,00. The new stadium was commonly known in 1929 as Corcoran Field which was the preexisting name of the school's athletic field. It was also sometimes referred to as St. Xavier Stadium. The formal dedication was conducted on November 23, 1929, prior to the game against . Cincinnati Mayor Murray Seasongood presented the stadium to the college president.

Schedule

References

St. Xavier
Xavier Musketeers football seasons
St. Xavier Musketeers football